Public Inter College Kerakat is a college in Kerakat Tehsil in Jaunpur district, Uttar Pradesh state, India. It is located near Subash Chandra Bose(S.C.Bose) Chauraha kerakat Sipah Road. The college focuses on the arts, commerce and science streams. Vocational courses like nursery teacher training, typing and computer are also available.

Main courses
Science(MATH+BIO)
ARTS
Commerce

Facilities
PIC KERAKAT has a library consisting of over 10,000 books, along with monthly magazines, bulletins, newspapers.

The college also provides facilities for students to pursue sporting activities on the college campus, including outdoor facilities for athletics, football, basketball and volleyball.

Scholarships
Public Inter college kerakat Jaunpur provides education to all students without tuition fee. SC, ST, OBC and poor students are granted scholarship as per government rules. Moreover, the school manages special scholarships for meritorious and economically weak students specially
 Major Omprakash Singh Scholarship For Topper Students..

Nearby landmarks
An ancient temple dedicated to Goddess Saraswati is just inside the college campus named Pragya Hall. The temple provides the spiritual environment to students, teachers and members of staff. Many festivals are celebrated in the temple.

References
 http://madhyamikshiksha.upsdc.gov.in/en-us/School-Detail/School/14822-public-inter-college-kerakat-jaunpur-varanasi-division
 http://upmspboard.com/About-College-PUBLIC-INTER-COLLEGE-KERAKAT-JAUNPUR.html

External links 
 https://m.facebook.com/publicintercollege/

Universities and colleges in Jaunpur district
Intermediate colleges in Uttar Pradesh
High schools and secondary schools in Uttar Pradesh